Markus Naewie (born 7 January 1970) is a former professional tennis player from Germany.

Naewie had his best year on tour in 1992, when he broke into the top 100 of the ATP rankings. He defeated Jason Stoltenberg in the French Open that year and almost upset 14th seed Alexander Volkov in the second round, taking him to five sets. At the Heineken Open in Auckland he was a quarter-finalist and he also made the semi-finals of Munich's BMW Open. In the latter he defeated Richard Krajicek, the world number 17, in the opening round and only missed out on a spot in the final when he lost a final set tiebreak 7–9 to Magnus Larsson. Also that year, Naewie and partner Lars Koslowski made the quarter-finals of the German Open, an ATP Super 9 event, defeating en route the Grand Slam winning pairing of Scott Davis and David Pate. In the Swedish Open he teamed up with Menno Oosting to reach the semi finals.

The German dropped out of the top 100 in 1993 but did manage to reach a quarter-final in Gstaad. In the doubles he and Bernd Karbacher were semi-finalists in Munich. He blew a two set lead against Jeff Tarango in the 1993 French Open, having earlier lost a five setter that year to Daniel Vasek in the Australian Open.

Challenger titles

Singles: (2)

References

1970 births
Living people
German male tennis players
West German male tennis players
Sportspeople from Bremen